Veliš is a municipality and village in Benešov District in the Central Bohemian Region of the Czech Republic. It has about 300 inhabitants.

Administrative parts
Villages of Lipiny u Veliše, Nespery and Sedlečko are administrative parts of Veliš.

References

Villages in Benešov District